Botryodontia millavensis is a species of fungus belonging to the family Phanerochaetaceae.

It is native to Northern Europe.

References

Phanerochaetaceae